Wandering Spirit is the third solo album by Mick Jagger. Released in 1993, it was his only solo album release of the 1990s.

Background
Following The Rolling Stones' Steel Wheels (1989), Jagger began writing new material for what would become Wandering Spirit. In January 1992, after landing Rick Rubin as co-producer, Jagger recorded the album in Los Angeles over seven months until September 1992, recording simultaneously as Keith Richards was making Main Offender.

Jagger kept the celebrity guests to a minimum on Wandering Spirit, only having Lenny Kravitz as a vocalist on his cover of Bill Withers' "Use Me" and bassist Flea from Red Hot Chili Peppers on three tracks.

Following the end of The Rolling Stones' Sony Music contract and their signing to Virgin Records, Jagger elected to sign with Atlantic Records (which had signed the Stones in the 1970s) to distribute what would be his only album with the label.

Critical reception

Released in February 1993, Wandering Spirit was commercially successful, reaching No. 12 in the UK and No. 11 in the US, going gold there. The track "Sweet Thing" was the lead single, although it was the second  single, "Don't Tear Me Up", which found moderate success, topping Billboards Album Rock Tracks chart for one week. Critical reaction was very strong, noting Jagger's abandonment of slick synthesizers in favour of an incisive and lean guitar sound.

Track listing

Personnel
Mick Jagger – vocals, guitar, clavinet, harmonica, percussion
David Bianco – synthesizer
Curt Bisquera – drums
Lenny Castro – percussion
Matt Clifford – virginal, harpsichord, string arrangements, conductor
Flea – bass guitar on "Out of Focus", "Use Me" and "I've Been Lonely for So Long"
Lynn Davis – backing vocals
Jim Keltner – drums on "Evening Gown"
Lenny Kravitz – vocals on "Use Me"
Jay Dee Maness – pedal steel guitar
Jean McClain – backing vocals
Pamela Quinlan - piano, backing vocals
Robin McKidd – fiddle
Brendan O'Brien – guitar
Jeff Pescetto – backing vocals
John Pierce – bass guitar (tracks: 1, 4, 5, 7 to 11, 13, 14) 
Courtney Pine – saxophone
Billy Preston – piano, Hammond organ, clavinet
Jimmy Rip – lead guitar, percussion
Frank Simes – guitar
Benmont Tench – piano, Hammond organ
Doug Wimbish – bass guitar on "Sweet Thing"
Technical
David Bianco - engineer
Jim Champagne, Peter Lewis, Steve Holroyd, Steve Musters - assistant engineer
Melanie Nissen - art direction
Richard Bates - design
Annie Leibovitz – photography

Charts

Weekly charts

Year-end charts

Certifications and sales

Notes

External links
 Rolling Stone review

1993 albums
Mick Jagger albums
Albums produced by Mick Jagger
Albums produced by Rick Rubin
Atlantic Records albums